Piedmont Interstate Fairgrounds is a half mile (0.8 km) dirt oval near Spartanburg, South Carolina. The track held NASCAR Grand National races in the 1950s and 1960s.

History
An October 1908 program was found for a horse trotting and racing event at the fair. The first car racing event was held at the track in 1939 and it was promoted by Joe Littlejohn; he promoted events at the track until 1966.

Littlejohn was one of 35 people who attended Bill France Sr.'s 1947 meeting which led to the formation of NASCAR; Piedmont was a major hub in NASCAR's first two decades. It held 22 Grand National Series races between 1953 and 1966 as well as two NASCAR Convertible Series races (1956 and 1957). Afterward the NASCAR races ended, the track held races during the fair in (North America) autumn. The track was regraded in 2002 for a legends race to benefit a local racing museum; by 2005 the idea of a museum was scrapped. According to the local visitor's bureau website (in 2017), the track hasn't held a regular schedule of races for many years (although some of the racing surface remains visible).

Results

NASCAR Grand National Series
results

NASCAR Convertible Series
results

References

External links
Race results at RacingReference.com

Motorsport venues in South Carolina
NASCAR tracks